S. Rajakumar is an Indian politician. A member of the Indian National Congress, he represents the Mayiladuthurai constituency in the Tamil Nadu Legislative Assembly.

Rajakumar was first elected to the Tamil Nadu Legislative Assembly in 2006. He ran for re-election in 2011 but lost to DMDK candidate R. Arulselvan by approximately 3,000 votes. He ran again in the 2021 election and was elected to his former office, defeating Pattali Makkal Katchi candidate A. Palanichamy.

References

Indian National Congress politicians from Tamil Nadu
Living people
Tamil Nadu MLAs 2006–2011
Tamil Nadu MLAs 2021–2026
Year of birth missing (living people)